Telicota bambusae, the dark palm dart, is a  grass skipper butterfly of the family Hesperiidae. It is found in India, Sri Lanka and on Peninsular Malaysia.

Description

Subspecies
Telicota bambusae bambusae (Moore, 1878) – Oriental Dark Palm-Dart
Telicota bambusae horisha Evans, 1934

References

External links
 

Taractrocerini
Butterflies described in 1878
Butterflies of Sri Lanka
Butterflies of Malaysia
Taxa named by Frederic Moore